Punta Delgada is a small town in the far south of Chile, close to the border with Argentina, on the RN255 between Punta Arenas and Rio Gallegos.  It is the principal settlement in San Gregorio commune in Magallanes Province.

Since 1921, there has been a Military Station in the town holding a full Infantry Battalion of the Chilean Army plus a small boat flotilla of the Chilean Navy along with Chilean Navy Signals/Communications HQ as well as a Navy SIGINT and Naval Intelligence forward base. Nearby is a ferry terminal at the Primera Angostura, from where the Pionero crosses the Strait of Magellan to Tierra del Fuego. Pali-Aike National Park lies 18 km north of the town.

See also

 Lighthouses in Chile
 List of lighthouses in Chile

References 

Populated places in Magallanes Province
Populated places in the Strait of Magellan